Enterprise Car Sales is an American used car retailer headquartered in Clayton, Missouri and is a service of the Enterprise Rent-A-Car brand, which is owned by Enterprise Holdings, one of the major car rental operators. , the company operates over 145 dealerships in the United States. The company was established in 1962 by Enterprise Rent-A-Car founder Jack C. Taylor.

Most of the vehicles sold by the company come from Enterprise Holdings’ fleet of rental vehicles. Former rental vehicles have an above-average likelihood of wear and tear, but the company says they strictly follow the manufacturer’s maintenance schedule, and all vehicles pass a safety inspection before being sold. Enterprise also offers buyers CARFAX vehicle history reports.

The company was an early adopter of the "haggle-free" approach to pricing used cars, later used by competitor CarMax and online used car retailers like Carvana. While most small used car dealers sell vehicles "as is", Enterprise offers a 7-day/1,000-mile buyback policy, a 12-month/12,000-mile limited powertrain warranty and 12 months of roadside assistance. The company offers financing through a network of preferred lenders, as well as a private label financing program through Chase.

References

External links 

Enterprise Holdings
American companies established in 1962
Retail companies established in 1962
Auto dealerships of the United States